The 1966–67 Mitropa Cup was the 27th season of the Mitropa football club tournament. It was won by Spartak Trnava who beat Újpesti Dózsa in the two-legged final 5–4 on aggregate.

Round of 16
Matches played between 9 November and 8 December 1966.

|}

Quarter-finals
Matches played between 15 and 30 March 1967.

|}

Semi-finals
The first legs were played on 27 April, and the second legs were played on 10 May 1967.

|}

Final

|}

See also
1966–67 European Cup
1966–67 European Cup Winners' Cup
1966–67 Inter-Cities Fairs Cup
1966–67 Balkans Cup

External links
1966–67 Mitropa Cup at Rec.Sport.Soccer Statistics Foundation

1966-67
1966–67 in European football
1966–67 in Hungarian football
1966–67 in Yugoslav football
1966–67 in Austrian football
1966–67 in Czechoslovak football
1966–67 in Italian football